Aq Otaq (also Romanized as Āq Oţāq; also known as Āgh Oţāq) is a village in Ahmadabad Rural District, Takht-e Soleyman District, Takab County, West Azerbaijan Province, Iran. At the 2006 census, its population was 266, in 58 families.

References 

Populated places in Takab County